The 1892 Rhode Island gubernatorial election was held on April 6, 1892. Republican nominee Daniel Russell Brown defeated Democratic nominee William T. C. Wardwell with 50.22% of the vote.

General election

Candidates
Major party candidates
Daniel Russell Brown, Republican
William T. C. Wardwell, Democratic

Other candidates
Alexander Gilbert, Prohibition
Franklin E. Burton, People's

Results

References

1892
Rhode Island
Gubernatorial